Lacebark tree is a common name for several plants with a inner lace-like layer of the inner bark, and may refer to:

 Brachychiton discolor and Brachychiton populneus, native to eastern Australia
 Genus Hoheria, also known as ribbonwood
 Lagetta species, especially  Lagetta lagetto, native to the Caribbean, also known as lacewood

See also
 Lacebark elm, a common name for Ulmus parvifolia
 Lacebark pine, a common name for Pinus bungeana